Major General William Bethune Lindsay  (3 November 1880 – 27 June 1933) was a Canadian military officer during World War I.

Lindsay was born on 3 November 1880, the son of Dr. W, B. Lindsay, of Strathroy, Ontario, Canada. Lindsay was educated at Strathroy District Collegiate Institute and later enrolled at the Royal Military College of Canada. In 1900, he was appointed assistant engineer of the Department of Marine and Fisheries. Lindsay was one of the original officers of the Corps of Royal Canadian Engineers. During the First World War, he served as Chief Engineer of the Canadian Corps. He died at Toronto Hunt Club on 27 June 1933 and is buried at Strathroy Municipal Cemetery.

References

1880 births
1933 deaths
Canadian military personnel from Ontario
Burials in Ontario
Royal Military College of Canada alumni
Canadian Companions of the Distinguished Service Order
Canadian Companions of the Order of St Michael and St George
Canadian Companions of the Order of the Bath
Canadian generals of World War I
Royal Canadian Engineers officers
People from Middlesex County, Ontario